Mario Alberto Rafael Zepahua Valencia (born 1 January 1970) is a Mexican politician affiliated with the Institutional Revolutionary Party. He served as Deputy of the LIX Legislature of the Mexican Congress representing Veracruz.

References

1970 births
Living people
Politicians from Veracruz
Institutional Revolutionary Party politicians
20th-century Mexican politicians
21st-century Mexican politicians
Municipal presidents in Veracruz
Members of the Congress of Veracruz
Deputies of the LIX Legislature of Mexico
Members of the Chamber of Deputies (Mexico) for Veracruz